Feroze Jung III or Nizam Shahabuddin Muhammad Feroz Khan Siddiqi Bayafandi also known by his sobriquet Imad-ul-Mulk, was the grand vizier of the Mughal Empire allied with the Maratha Empire, who were often described as a de facto ruler of the Mughal Empire. He was the son of Ghazi ud-Din Khan Feroze Jung II and a grandson of the founder of the Nizam Dynasty, Nizam ul Mulk Asaf Jah. 

A controversial figure, Imad is well known for imprisoning and blinding emperor Ahmad Shah Bahadur, for assassinating emperor Alamgir II and torturing their family members including future emperor Shah Alam II. He was declared to be an apostate by various Islamic scholars and by Durrani Emperor Ahmad Shah Abdali. After the death of his father in 1752, he was recommended by Nawab Safdar Jung to be appointed as Mir Bakhshi (Pay Master General) and received the titles of Amir ul-Umara (Noble of Nobles) and Imad ul-Mulk.

Military career

He blinded and imprisoned Emperor Ahmad Shah Bahadur in 1754. In 1757, Imad invited Marathas to invade Delhi in order to drive out the Afghans and Rohillas from Delhi. In the same year, Afghanistan's Emperor Ahmad Shah Durrani declared Imad-ul-Mulk an "apostate". Two years later, Emperor Alamgir II was assassinated in 1759. He was later named the Wazir ul-Mamalik-i-Hindustan. 

Imad-ul-Mulk also planned the death of young Ali Gauhar and even ordered Mir Jafar the Nawab of Bengal to advance as far as Patna with the motive to kill or capture the Mughal Crown Prince. Imad-ul-Mulk soon fled Delhi after the rise of Najib-ud-Daula and the Mughal Army, which eventually places Shah Alam II as the new Mughal Emperor.

Writings and later life 
According to the biography of the poet called Gulzar Ibrahim, he was living in 1780 in straitened circumstances. In 1784 he made a deal with the Maratha Peshwa and received Baoni jagir of 52 villages near Kalpi. 

Subsequently, he proceeded to Surat where he passed a few years with the English and then went on the Hajj. He composed Persian and Rekhta poetry and left Arabic and Turkish Ghazals and a thick Persian Diwan and a Masnawi Fakhria-tun_Nizam and Nalaa-e-Ny in which the miracles of Maulana Fakhar-ud-Din are related. His pen name was Nizam.

Personal life 
Under the influence of Sufism he abandoned his power hungry political career and went to Maharshrif, Chishtian (now Pakistan) to live with Noor Muhammad Maharvi, his fellow disciple of Moulana Fakhar-ud-Din was Muhib-un-Nabi Dehlavi. He wrote the death date of Noor Muhammad Maharvi in a poetic way
حیف واویلا جہاں بے نور گشت, which refers to date 1205 Hijri, meaning that as late as 1791 he had been residing in Maharsharif.

After Noor Muhammad Maharvi's death Nizam moved to Khairpur (near Bahawalpur) and died there in 1800, where his grave is located.

His wife was the celebrated Ganna or Gunna Begam who died in the year 1775. His son Naser-ad-Daula succeeded as the Nawab of Baoni jagir.

Popular culture 
In the 2019 Bollywood war epic Panipat, the character of Imad-ul-Mulk and his role in the events leading up to the Third Battle of Panipat is portrayed by Mir Sarwar.

In the TV series The Great Maratha 1994 the role was played by Jitendra Trehan

See also 
 Hyderabad State
 Nizam

References

External links 

Mughal nobility
1736 births
1800 deaths
People from Jalaun
Grand viziers of the Mughal Empire